

This is a list of properties on the National Register of Historic Places in Hartford, Connecticut.

This is intended to be a complete list of the properties and districts on the National Register of Historic Places in Hartford, Connecticut, United States. The locations of National Register properties and districts for which the latitude and longitude coordinates are included below, may be seen in various online maps.

There are more than 400 properties and districts listed on the National Register in Hartford County, including 21 National Historic Landmarks. The city of Hartford is the location of 142 of these properties and districts, including 7 National Historic Landmarks; they are listed here, while the other properties and districts in the remaining parts of the county, including 14 National Historic Landmarks, are listed separately. Eight properties and districts straddle the border between Hartford and other municipalities in the county; they appear on multiple lists.

Altogether, as of 2005, about 20 percent of the properties in the city, including more than 4,000 buildings, were listed as historic properties or included in historic districts.

Current listings

|}

Former listings

|}

See also

List of National Historic Landmarks in Connecticut
National Register of Historic Places listings in Connecticut

References

 
Hartford